Conner (Salish: epɫmsáwíʔ) is a census-designated place (CDP) in Ravalli County, Montana, United States. The population was 216 at the 2010 census.

The town was named in 1906 for the first homesteader, Aaron Conner.

Geography
U.S. Route 93 passes just to the east of the CDP, leading north through the Bitterroot Valley  to Hamilton, the county seat, and south over Lost Trail Pass  to Salmon, Idaho.

Climate
This climatic region is typified by large seasonal temperature differences, with warm to hot (and often humid) summers and cold (sometimes severely cold) winters.  According to the Köppen Climate Classification system, Conner has a humid continental climate, abbreviated "Dfb" on climate maps.

Demographics

References

Census-designated places in Ravalli County, Montana
Census-designated places in Montana